Phapar ko roti is a Nepali traditional food item and cooked in the style of pancake. Nepalis consume this pancake with achar of various kinds.

Preparation and ingredients
Buckwheat flour is added with a little amount of plain rice flour and pinch of salt in it. The dough is semi-liquid which contains chopped onions, chopped tomatoes, milk, water, egg white etc. All the above ingredients are mixed and a semi liquid thick paste is made by stirring well. Once the consistency is achieved, dough is poured on hot ghee on a flat pan. Once the either side is brown in color and crunchy, the 'roti' is ready to serve.

See also
 List of pancakes
 List of fried dough varieties

References

Pancakes
Nepalese cuisine
Indian cuisine